Rudolf Vesper (born 3 April 1939) is a former Olympic wrestler for East Germany.  Born in Niehmen, Lower Silesia, Vesper competed for the Unified German team in the 1964 Summer Olympics in Tokyo, and then East Germany in 1968 in Mexico City.  Both times, he competed in the men's welterweight division of the Greco-Roman wrestling event.

The first time Vesper competed, in 1964, he did not win a medal.  However, the second time, in 1968, Vesper won a gold medal in the Greco-Roman wrestling event.

Vesper also competed for East Germany in the FILA Wrestling World Championships.  Upon his first appearance, 1963, in Helsingborg, he came in second in the Greco-Roman event. He competed in the 78kg weight class and the Seniors age group.  His second appearance, in 1967, held in Bucharest, also resulted in a silver medal in the Greco-Roman event.  He competed in the Seniors age group and the 78 kg weight class.

Sources

German wrestlers
1939 births
Living people
Olympic medalists in wrestling
Olympic gold medalists for East Germany
Wrestlers at the 1964 Summer Olympics
Wrestlers at the 1968 Summer Olympics
German male sport wrestlers
Olympic wrestlers of the United Team of Germany
Olympic wrestlers of East Germany
People from Oława County
Sportspeople from Lower Silesian Voivodeship
People from the Province of Silesia
World Wrestling Championships medalists
Medalists at the 1968 Summer Olympics